¿El Concepto? is the second album of the Puerto Rican rock band Sol D'Menta. The album was released by Polygram on June 16, 1998.

The song "Cerro Maravilla" is about the incidents that happened at the mountain of the same name in Puerto Rico (see Cerro Maravilla Incident).

Track listing

Musicians

Band members
 Ricky Díaz – vocals
 Erick "Jey" Seda – bass
 Miguel "Tito" Rodríguez – guitar
 Ernesto "Che" Rodríguez – drums

Guest musicians
 Keefus Cianca – keyboards
 Davy Chegwidden – percussion and "weird sounds"
 Geof Gaellegos – baritone saxophone and "weird sounds"
 Tracy Wannomae – saxophone
 Matt Demerritt – tenor saxophone
 Todd M. Simon – trumpet and flugelhorn
 Dan Ostermann – trombone
 John Avila – upright bass
 Brandon – barks
 Bobbie Chapman – organ
 Dennis Nieves – backing vocals
 Luis Pérez – backing vocals

Personnel
 Recorded November, 1997 at NRG Studios in Hollywood, California, except Track 5 recorded at ALFA Recording Studios in 1998.
 John Ewing Jr. – Recording and Mix Engineer
 Michael Baskette – Recording and Mix Assistant
 Lisa Lewis – Mix Assistant
 Additional Recording at Brando's Paradise, San Gabriel, California
 John Avila – Additional Recording Engineer
 Mastered by Renato Pinto Visom, Fort Lauderdale, Florida

1998 albums
PolyGram albums
Spanish-language albums
Sol D'Menta albums